The following highways are numbered 456:

Japan
 Japan National Route 456

United States
  Louisiana Highway 456
  Maryland Route 456
  New Mexico State Road 456
  New York State Route 456
  Pennsylvania Route 456
  Puerto Rico Highway 456
  Farm to Market Road 456